Aileen Elizabeth Lynch (1898–1983) was an Australian public servant and Women's Land Army state Superintendent.

Early life
She was born Elizabeth Eileen Ryan on 15 May 1898 in Waverley, Sydney. She was the daughter of Irish immigrants Patrick Ryan, a sewage labourer, and Mary Murphy. She studied at the St. Clare's Convent in Waverly.

Career
In 1917 she began work as a typist at the Department of Public Works for the New South Wales Public Service. In 1924 she started working for the Premier's Department, first as a part of the migration agreement executive committee, and later in the ministerial office.

In 1941 she became part of the Women's Auxiliary National Service, serving as the officer-in-charge of headquarters administration. In 1942 Lynch was appointed to work at the Directorate of Manpower, where she worked closely with land armies. A few months later she was made Superintendent of the Women's Land Army in New South Wales.

In 1946 she returned to the Permier's Department and continued to work there until her resignation in 1947. She temporarily worked for the Child and Welfare department from 1960 to 1963.

She died  in Waverton on 20 January 1983 and was cremated.

Personal life
She married Francis Swinbourne Lynch, a cable clerk, on 1 October 1927. The couple had no children.

Footnotes

References
 Servicewomen's Farewell, The Australian Women's Weekly, (Saturday, 19 May 1945), p.24.

External links
Aileen Lynch in the Australian Dictionary of Biography
 Lynch, Aileen Elizabeth (1898-1983): The Australian Women's Register.

1898 births
1983 deaths
19th-century Australian women
20th-century Australian women
Public servants of New South Wales